Andriasa is a genus of moths in the family Sphingidae first described by Francis Walker in 1856.

Species
Andriasa contraria Walker, 1856
Andriasa mitchelli Hayes, 1973

References

Smerinthini
Moth genera
Taxa named by Francis Walker (entomologist)